Zack Baun (born December 30, 1996) is an American football outside linebacker for the New Orleans Saints of the National Football League (NFL). He played college football at Wisconsin and was selected 74th overall by the Saints in the 2020 NFL Draft.

Early life and high school
Baun grew up in West Bend, Wisconsin and initially attended West Bend East High School. His family moved to Brown Deer, Wisconsin after his sophomore year and he transferred to Brown Deer High School, where he played basketball and football and ran track. Baun moved from playing wide receiver at West Bend to quarterback and linebacker at Brown Deer. As a senior, Baun was named the Wisconsin Football Coaches Association (WFCA) State Offensive Player of the Year and was also named Dave Krieg State Quarterback of the Year after passing for 1,936 yards and 20 touchdowns and rushing for 1,837 yards and a state-leading 39 touchdowns. Baun committed to play college football at Wisconsin with the intention of gray shirting his freshman year. In basketball, Baun was a starter for Brown Deer's 2013 WIAA Division II State Championship team and he placed in the Division II state track championship in both the 100 meter and 200 meter dashes.

College career
Baun redshirted his true freshman season after breaking his left foot going into the season. He appeared in 12 games as a redshirt freshman, making 15 tackles (3.5 for loss) with a forced fumble. Baun missed the entirety of his redshirt sophomore season after re-injuring his left foot during spring practices. Baun was named a starter at outside linebacker for the Badgers going into his redshirt junior season and finished the season as the team's third-leading tackler with 63 stops (7.5 for a loss) with 2.5 sacks, 3 pass breakups, one interception] and a fumble recovery.

Baun entered his redshirt senior season on the watchlist for the Butkus Award and was voted to be a team captain. He was named midseason All-American by the Associated Press and Sporting News after leading the Badgers in sacks (6), tackles for loss (10.5), and forced fumbles (2) through the first six games of the season. Baun finished the season with 76 tackles, 19.5 tackles for loss and 12.5 sacks and was named first team All-Big Ten and a first team All-American by the Football Writers Association of America and the Walter Camp Football Foundation.

Professional career

Baun was selected by the New Orleans Saints in the third round with the 74th pick in the 2020 NFL Draft. Baun made his debut on September 21, 2020, on Monday Night Football against the Las Vegas Raiders, playing on special teams.

References

External links
Wisconsin Badgers bio

1996 births
Living people
People from Milwaukee County, Wisconsin
Players of American football from Wisconsin
Sportspeople from the Milwaukee metropolitan area
American football linebackers
Wisconsin Badgers football players
New Orleans Saints players
All-American college football players